The 1963–64 Primeira Divisão was the 30th season of top-tier football in Portugal.

Overview 
It was contested by 14 teams, and S.L. Benfica won the championship.

League standings

Results

References

External links 
 Portugal 1963-64 - RSSSF (Jorge Miguel Teixeira)
 Portuguese League 1963/64 - footballzz.co.uk
 Portugal - Table of Honor - Soccer Library 

Primeira Liga seasons
1963–64 in Portuguese football
Portugal